Ali ibn al-Husayn ibn Ali ibn Muhammad ibn al-Walid was the ninth Tayyibi Isma'ili Dāʿī al-Muṭlaq in Yemen, from 1268 to his death in 1284.

Life
He was the son and chief assistant of the eighth Dāʿī, al-Husayn ibn Ali, and thus a member of the Banu al-Walid al-Anf family that dominated the office of Dāʿī al-Muṭlaq almost continuously in the 13th to early 16th centuries.

Due to intense fighting between the Zaidi Imam and the Hamdanids, Ali moved from his original seat at Sanaa to the Hamdanid fortress of Arus. He returned to Sanaa only after it was recaptured by the Hamdanids, and died there. He was succeeded by Ali ibn al-Husayn ibn Ali ibn Hanzala, the grandson of the sixth Dāʿī, Ali ibn Hanzala, and son of Ali's own maʾdhūn (senior deputy).

References

Sources
 

Year of birth unknown
1284 deaths
Banu al-Walid al-Anf
Tayyibi da'is
13th century in Yemen

13th-century Arabs
13th-century Ismailis
13th-century Islamic religious leaders